Several ships have been named Niagara. They include:

RMS Niagara, a Cunard Line ship launched in 1848
, an ocean liner launched in 1912 and sunk by a mine in 1940
, a Thames sailing barge launched in 1898
, an ocean liner launched in 1908 as Corse, renamed Niagara in 1910 and scrapped in 1931
: various United States Navy vessels of that name
, transferred to the Royal Canadian Navy in 1940 and renamed HMCS Niagara
Niagara (tug), wooden tugboat built in 1872, sank in 1904

See also
 Niagara (disambiguation)#Ships
 Niagara II (ship)

Ship names